Reclamation is a compilation album by Vancouver industrial band Front Line Assembly, released in 1997. It was re-released on July 30, 2007 through Polish label Metal Mind.

The booklet contains on two pages an outline of the band's history. It was written in July 1997 by Gary Levermore, founder of the record label Third Mind that issued many of Front Line Assembly's releases in the 1980s and the 1990s.

Some of the tracks, despite not being marked as remixes, have minor arrangement changes and/or longer running times.  For example, "Provision" features an instrumental version of the chorus before the first verse which is not heard on the original from the album Caustic Grip.

Track listing

Personnel

Front Line Assembly
 Bill Leeb – production, vocals
 Rhys Fulber – production (3–12), remixing (6)
 Michael Balch – production (1, 2), engineering (1, 2), mixing (1, 2)

Additional musicians
 Jeff Stoddard – guitar (5)

Technical personnel
 Greg Reely – additional production (6, 10), editing (1, 2, 4, 11, 12), engineering (3–12), mixing (3–5, 7–12)
 Anthony Valcic – engineering (1), mixing (1)
 Mark Stagg – remixing (6)
 Tom Baker – mastering (3)
 Dave McKean – artwork

References

Front Line Assembly compilation albums
1997 compilation albums
Albums with cover art by Dave McKean
Roadrunner Records compilation albums
Albums produced by Rhys Fulber